Robert E. "Bob" Stephenson (born September 20, 1959) is a former American football player.  A native of Evansville, Indiana, Stephenson graduated from Reitz High and played college football as a tight end for the Indiana University Hoosiers football team from 1979 to 1981. As a member of the 1979 Indiana Hoosiers football team, he played in the 1979 Holiday Bowl and scored the first touchdown in a bowl game in Indiana Hoosiers football history.  He was selected by both the coaches (UPI) and media (AP) as the first-team tight end on the 1981 All-Big Ten Conference football team.  He was selected as the tight end on the all-time Indiana football teams named by the Chicago Tribune in 1993 and by Inside Indiana magazine. He was inducted into the Indiana Football Hall of Fame in 2007.

References

1959 births
Living people
People from Evansville, Indiana
American football tight ends
Indiana Hoosiers football players
Players of American football from Indiana